Gregorio Rossello (born 13 August 1991), better known as Grego Rossello, is an Argentine actor, comedian, presenter and internet personality. He is known for making various funny videos about different everyday situations on the Instagram social network, for his participation in various television programs, and as a stand-up comedian.

Life and career 
After his debut on the big screen, at age 13, in the commercial flop Palabra por palabra, Rossello did not perform again until he began college. He trained in dramatic arts at IUNA while studying for a degree in history at Di Tella. He made numerous appearances on television shows in Argentina in the early 2010s, such as Casi Angeles, Enseñame a vivir, Sueña conmigo, Secretos de amor, Víndica and Herederos de una venganza. However, his fame came from posting short videos to the Internet.

Grego became the first comedian in the history of Argentine stand-up to present his show at the Gran Rex, which he did twice. After "a lot of effort" and several videos on Instagram, he finally reached the TV screen, where he has presented ESPN Redes (Argentina) since 2016. However, he says his journey to "success", a word he uses in reference to himself with caution, was not easy.

In 2017, he joined the historical show Polémica en el bar, starred in the movie Bruja with Erica Rivas and Pablo Rago, and took a lead role in What could happen? with Darío Lopilato.

In 2018 he presented the 2017 Martín Fierro Digital Awards with Florencia Vigna. He also hosted, with Ivana Nadal, La Voz Argentina: MTV After Hours, where he interviewed the participants, judges and coaches of the new season of La Voz... Argentina.

Filmography

Theatre 

 Ridículos (2019-present)

Accolades

References 

Argentine television presenters
1991 births
Living people